Lift is the 11th studio album by Canadian singer-songwriter Dave Gunning. It was released in 2015 by Wee House of Music. On Lift, Gunning collaborated with musicians from Nova Scotia, New Brunswick, Prince Edward Island, and North Carolina. It is the first album of Gunning's albums to be self-produced.

Track listing

All songs written by Dave Gunning, except where noted.

Personnel
Dave Gunning  –  acoustic guitars, vocals, background vocals, ukulele, percussion, organ, banjo on track 4 and 10, other little sounds here and there
Jamie Robinson  –  mandolin on track 10, hammertone on track 5, acoustic guitar on track 9, electric guitar on track 6 
Asa Brosius  –  pedal steel
Darren McMullen  –  mandolin, mandola and bouzouki
JP Cormier  –  fiddle, banjo on track 2, 3, 7
Thom Swift –  resonator guitar on track 3
Sara DeLong Gunning –  harmony vocals on track 10
Sing It Louder Choir – John Parker, Julie Gunning, and Sara DeLong Gunning

Production
Dave Gunning – producer, recording, mixing, mastering
JP Cormier – assistant producer
Jamie Robinson – assistant producer
A Man Called Wrycraft – art direction, design and layout

References

2015 albums
Dave Gunning albums